The Nine Billion Names of God is a 2018 French short film based on the 1953 short story of the same name by British writer Arthur C. Clarke. The film was selected for many international film festivals.

Plot
For centuries, the monks of Sera Mey monastery in Tibet have been trying to discover all nine billion names of God, by calculating each and every possible combination of the letters in their alphabet. They believe that discovering the names is actually the ultimate purpose of the Universe. The monks calculate the godly names manually; however, in 1957, they decide to employ a modern technology to perform the task quicker. The monks send a messenger to New York City to meet with computer scientist Dr. Wagner and to rent a powerful IBM-like computer. Two American engineers, Georges and Chuck, have also been invited to visit the monastery to install and program the mainframe, so the monks can complete their mission. Once all the names are discovered and listed, strange things start happening.

Cast
Paul Bandey as Dr. Wagner
Rotem Jackman as Georges Hanley
Lennard Ridsdale as Chuck
Guéshé Lundup as Great Lama
Yves Yan as Lama Dilgo

See also
Darren Aronofsky's 1998 film Pi, in which a powerful computer is used to divine the 216-character name of God.
Names of God

References

External links

2018 films
French short films
2010s French films